The Koktebel Jazz Festival is a jazz and world music festival in Ukraine. Until 2013 it used to take place annually in second week of September in Koktebel on the Black Sea coast. In 2014 it was held in Zatoka and Bilhorod-Dnistrovskyi (both in Odessa Oblast).

About the festival
Koktebel Jazz Festival (KJF) kicked off in 2003 as an attempt to revive Koktebel's status as the cultural center of the region, back at its days famous all over the country.

Since 2006, the festival is held in the second half of September, during so-called "velvet" resort season. Despite its young age, the festival has already hosted performances by De-Phazz, Stanley Clarke, Billy Cobham, Nino Katamadze, Us3 and others. Beside well-known names, organizers consider small and young bands. In 2008, festival community was launched (link), where anyone can file an application for participation. The best performers chosen by users voting will take part in the upcoming festival.

The festival consists of two main stages, which host the festival program, additional stages and numerous jam-sessions. The main stages do not have any entrance fees and are located at the square right near the water, so that the public can sit on the beach during the performance.

Visitors and participants value the festival for its unofficial and democratic spirit, induced by the place itself, and the inspiring combination of the jazz and the sea. Remarkable nature of the  Kara Dag volcanic mountain range located near Koktebel and range of wines and brandies grown on the vineyards nearby complete the picture. In 2014 the festival was not held in Crimea, but in Zatoka and Bilhorod-Dnistrovskyi (both in Odessa Oblast).

History

2003
Participants:

Shid-Side (Ukraine)
Crimea MVD Orchestra (Ukraine)
Jan Tabachnik (Ukraine)
Night Groove (Ukraine)
Jurij Kuznetsov & Tatiana Boeva
Enver Ismylov
Dixie Friends (Russia)
Vladimir Solianik

2004 
July 15–18

Participants:

Igor Butman Quartet (Russia)
Motion Trio (Poland)
Tomasz Szukalski Quartet (Poland)
Vladimir Solianik & Kiev Art Ansamble (Ukraine)
Patina (Latvia)
Night Groove (Ukraine)
City Jazz (Ukraine)
Igor Djachenko & Jazz-Ansamble Dnipro (Ukraine)
Vladimir Lazerson Band (Russia)
Dixie Friends (Russia)
Vladimir Molotkov & Gena Gutgartz (Ukraine) 
Enver Ismailov (Ukraine)

2005 
August 15–21

Participants:

De Phazz
Shibusashirazu Orchestra
Jimmy Bowskill Band 
Wolfgang Haffner - Sebastian Studnitzky Duo 
Leonid Ptashka Trio
ManSound 
JVL Big Band featuring Lew Soloff
Valentine Quartet featuring Lew Soloff
Vladimir Solianik & Kiev Art Ansamble
Big Blues Revival
VF Six 
Shid Side
TNMK
DJ Zipa 
Enver Ismailov
Green Point Orchestra

2006 
September 14–17
Participants:

Stanley Clarke Band
Billy Cobham Culture Mix Project 
Andrey Kondakov Brasil All Stars Project
Alexej Kozlov and ARS Nova Trio
Saskia Laroo Band 
Kenny "Blues Boss" Wayne
Tomasz Mucha and Manifest Band 
Apple Tea
Daha Braha 
Agafonnikov Band 
Aramis
Olli Siikanen Power Trio 
Susanna Jamalidinova
Sergey Davydov Trio 
DJ Paul Murphy 
DJ Fun2Mass 
Doctor Jazz
Kiev Salsa Kings

2007 
September 21–23

Notable participants:

Us3
Nino Katamadze & The Insight
Fatima Spar & Freedom Fries
The Shin
Elena Frolova & Creoles Tango Orchestra

2008 
September 19–21

Notable participants:

Archie Shepp Quartet and Mina Agossi
Richard Galliano and Tangaria Quartet
Geoffrey Oryema & Insight
Red Snapper
KUBIKMAGGI
Mamanet
Rekevin
Osimira

2009 
September 10–13

Notable participants:

Courtney Pine
Oi Va Voi
Tequillajazz
Haydamaky &*Voo Voo 
Djabe
Pur Pur

Этно-трио "Троица"
CherryVata

2010 
September 9–12

Notable participants:

Al Foster Quartet
Auktyon
Jerry Bergonzi Quintet
Karl Frierson
Paul Rogers Trio
Carsten Daerr Trio
Oleg Skrypka & Jazz Cabaret "Zabava" 
Faerd Trio &  Jullie Hjetland 
Vadim Eilenkrig and his group
Karl Ritter Trio

DakhaBrakha

2011 
September 15–18

Notable participants:

Parov Stelar
Red Snapper
Éric Serra
Anna Maria Jopek
Аквариум
Alina Orlova
Billy's Band
Алина Орлова
Pianoбой

2012 
August 29 - September 2

Notable participants:

The Cinematic Orchestra
Lyapis Trubetskoy
The Tiger Lillies
Pur:Pur
Oleg Kostrow
Tinavie
Серебряная свадьба
Нино Катамадзе & Insight
Zorge
Gorchitza
Karl Frierson
Катя Chilly

2013 
September 12–15

Notable participants:

Patrick Wolf
Bonobo
Télépopmusik
British Sea Power
Red Snapper
Nils Petter Molvær
Montefiori Cocktail
Billy's Band
Submotion Orchestra
Juniper
David Helbock
Pur:Pur
Pianoбой
Erik Truffaz Quartet

2014 
September 12–15

Notable participants:

The Brown Indian Band
The Jamal Thomas Band
Deborah Brown (de)
Valery Ponomaryov

2020 
August 21–23

Participants:

Big Jazz Orchestra & Peter Vostokov
ESH Ensemble
Manka Groove
The Yakov Okun Ensemble with Larisa Dolina & Hibla Gerzmava
Anastasia Lyutova & The Band
Wild Brass
Igor Sklyar and Jazz Classic Community & Sergei Golovnya
Moralny Kodex
Daniel Kramer Trio
Chetmen
Bril Brothers with Special Guests Igor Bril & Mariam Merabova
Sergei Golovnya's SG Big Band, with lead vocalist Karina Kozhevnikova

See also
Gogolfest

References
 

Jazz festivals in Ukraine
Recurring events established in 2003
Crimean culture
Odesa Oblast
Annual events in Ukraine
Autumn events in Ukraine